İsa Çelebi (d. September 1403) was an Ottoman prince and a co-ruler of the empire during the Ottoman Interregnum.

Background
İsa was one of the sons of Bayezid I, the Ottoman sultan. His mother was Devletşah Hatun, the daughter of Süleyman Şah of Germiyanids and Mutahhara Abide Hatun, daughter of Sultan Veled. İsa worked as a sanjak governor in Antalya and fought in the Battle of Ankara in 1402 with his father. The Ottoman army was defeated, Beyazid I was captured by Timurlane, and İsa escaped to west Anatolia.

Ottoman Interregnum 

In 1403, after learning about his father's death in captivity, he began to struggle for the vacant throne against his brothers Mehmet Çelebi, Musa Çelebi, and Süleyman Çelebi. He fought against Musa to gain control of Bursa, the Anatolian capital of the empire. He defeated Musa and won control of a part of Anatolian territory of the empire. But the European territory, Rumeli, was under the control of Süleyman and the east part of Anatolian territory was under the control of Mehmet (the future Mehmet I). Feeling his lands to be fragile situated between his brothers' on both sides, he signed a treaty of friendship with the Byzantine emperor Manuel II Palaiologos and refused Mehmet's suggestion to partition the Anatolian part of the empire with him, on the grounds that he was the elder brother and was entitled the entirety of the territory. But following this refusal, he was defeated by Mehmet in the Battle of Ulubad in 1405. In this battle, he also lost his vizier Timurtaş, who was an experienced statesman. He escaped to Rumeli over Byzantine territories.

He met with Süleyman, who supported his cause in Anatolia. With fresh troops provided by Süleyman, he returned to Anatolia and tried to recapture Bursa. Although he failed, allying himself with the Anatolian beyliks, which his father Beyazıt I had captured but which had regained independence after Beyazıt's defeat at the Battle of Ankara, he continued to fight against Mehmet. However, after a series of defeats and the betrayal of his allies, İsa gave up the war for the throne.

After losing the struggle, İsa went into hiding, and was spotted in a public bath in Eskişehir, and was strangled by Mehmed's partisans in 1403. Ruy González de Clavijo wrote that İsa Çelebi wasn't alive in September 1403.

Aftermath

After his death, the interregnum continued till 1413. In 1413, Mehmet became the sole ruler of the empire as Mehmet I after defeating Musa. Another one of the brothers, Mustafa Çelebi, who had been in hiding during the interregnum, later led two failed rebellions against the throne, one against Mehmet in 1416, and another in 1421 against his nephew Murat II. Murat called Mustafa Çelebi Düzmece Maustafa ("fake Mustafa") and executed him.

References 

Year of birth unknown
1403 deaths
15th-century people from the Ottoman Empire
Ottoman princes
Executed people from the Ottoman Empire
15th-century executions by the Ottoman Empire
People of the Ottoman Interregnum
Pretenders to the Ottoman throne
Date of birth unknown